Arthur Samuel Wilbur Chantry II (born April 9, 1954) is a graphic designer often associated with the posters and album covers he has done for bands from the Pacific Northwest, such as Mudhoney, Mono Men, Soundgarden, and The Sonics.

Biography 
Chantry received a bachelor's degree from Western Washington University in 1978.

Chantry's designs are perhaps most closely associated with the Seattle, Washington-based Sub Pop Records and the Bellingham, Washington-based Estrus Records, for which he has worked with dozens of bands. He is also notable for his work in magazine and logo design. Chantry worked throughout the 1980s as art director at The Rocket, a Seattle-based music biweekly.

Chantry advocates a low-tech approach to design that is informed by the history of the field. His work has been exhibited at the Rock and Roll Hall of Fame, Museum of Modern Art, Seattle Art Museum, the Smithsonian, and the Louvre. Chantry builds his record, poster, and magazine designs by hand, eschewing the now-ubiquitous computer and laser printer for X-Acto knives, Xerox machines, and photoset type. His bright, eye-popping creations can be seen frequently in the mom-and-pop record store as in the pages of establishment design magazines like Print or Communication Arts.

Some People Can't Surf: The Graphic Design of Art Chantry by Julie Lasky is a book released in 2001. The monograph explored Chantry's process crafting his graphic design.

Chantry is the author of the book Art Chantry Speaks: A Heretic's History of 20th Century Graphic Design, released in 2015.

Chantry is the recipient of the 2017 American Institute of Graphic Arts (AIGA) Medal.

References

External links
Official page
New York times review
AIGA Medalist 

1954 births
American graphic designers
Artists from Seattle
Living people
Western Washington University alumni
Logo designers
Artists from Tacoma, Washington

AIGA medalists